Wagga is Wagga Wagga, a city in New South Wales, Australia.

Wagga or Wagga Wagga may also refer to:

Wagga
 RAAF Base Wagga, a Royal Australian Air Force base
 HMAS Wagga, a ship

Wagga Wagga
 City of Wagga Wagga, a local government area, New South Wales, Australia
 Wagga Wagga Likoebe, actually Leonard Likoebe (1953–2006), South African footballer known as Wagga Wagga

See also
 Reduplication